George Stephen Garnett (born Watford, 1958) is a British academic historian, specialising in late Anglo-Saxon and Norman England. In 2014, the University of Oxford awarded him the title of Professor of Medieval History.

Education and career 
Garnett holds Master of Arts degrees from the University of Oxford and the University of Cambridge and completed his doctoral studies at Cambridge. He was appointed a Tutorial Fellow of St Hugh's College, Oxford, in 1990 and also a lecturer at Lady Margaret Hall, Oxford. In 2014, the University awarded him the title of Professor of Medieval History. The following year, he was appointed the University's senior proctor.

Select publications 
Garnett specialises in the history of England between the tenth and thirteenth centuries and has studied the impact of the Norman Conquest on kingship and land-holding in his 2007 monograph Conquered England: Kingship, Succession, and Tenure. He has subsequently studied the historiography of the Conquest, as well as late medieval early modern political writings about resistance. His publications include:

 "Dare Unchaperoned to Gaze": A Woman’s View of Edwardian Oxford (Oxford: St Hugh's College, Oxford, 2015)
 (with J. G. H. Hudson) "Introduction", in Magna Carta (Cambridge: Cambridge University Press, 2015), pp. 1–32
 "Magna Carta through eight centuries", in Oxford Dictionary of National Biography (Oxford: Oxford University Press, 2015)
 "Coronation", in The Wiley Blackwell Encyclopedia of Anglo-Saxon England (Wiley-Blackwell, 2013)
 John Selden and the Norman Conquest (London: Selden Society, 2013)
 "Robert Curthose: the duke who lost his trousers", Anglo-Norman Studies, vol. 35 (2012), pp. 213–243
 "'The ould fields': law and history in the prefaces to Sir Edward Coke's report", Journal of Legal History, vol. 34, issue 3 (2013), pp. 244–283
 The Norman Conquest: a Very Short Introduction (Oxford: Oxford University Press)
 Conquered England: Kingship, Succession and Tenure, 1066–1166 (Oxford: Oxford University Press, 2007).
 "Law in the Vindiciae, Contra Tyrannos: a vindication", The Historical Journal, vol. 49, issue 3 (2006), pp. 877–891
 Marsilius of Padua and 'the Truth of History (Oxford: Oxford University Press, 2006)
 Biographies of Fulk Bairnard (d. after 1242), Henry of Braybrooke (d. 1234), Richard Malebisse (c. 1155–c. 1209), Walter of Pattishall (d. c. 1231), and Walter Ullmann (1910–1983), in Oxford Dictionary of National Biography (Oxford: Oxford University Press, 2004).
 "Introduction", in A Short History of the Papacy in the Middle Ages (Routledge, 2003), pp. x–xviii
 "The third recension of the English coronation ordo: the manuscripts", The Haskins Society Journal (2003), pp. 43–71
 "Coronation", in The Blackwell Encyclopedia of Anglo-Saxon England (Blackwell), pp. 122–124
 "Conquered England", in The Oxford Illustrated History of Medieval England (Oxford: Oxford University Press, 2000), pp. 61–101
 "The origins of the crown", Proceedings of the British Academy, vol. 89 (1996), pp. 171–214
 (with J. C. Holt and J. Hudson) Law and Government in Medieval England and Normandy: Essays in Honour of Sir James Holt (Cambridge: Cambridge University Press, 1994)
 (with H. Languet) Brutus: Vindiciae, Contra Tyrannos (Cambridge: Cambridge University Press, 1994)
 "Coronation and propaganda: some implications of the Norman claim to the throne of England in 1066", Transactions of the Royal Historical Society, vol. 36 (1986), pp. 91–116
 "Franci et Angli: the legal distinctions between peoples after the Conquest", Anglo-Norman Studies, vol.  13 (1985).

References 

Living people
Alumni of the University of Cambridge
Fellows of St Hugh's College, Oxford
Academics of the University of Oxford
Fellows of the Royal Historical Society
1958 births